Szymon Franciszek Hołownia (born 3 September 1976) is a Polish journalist, politician, television personality, writer, political commentator and humanitarian activist. From 2008 to 2019 he co-hosted Mam talent!, the Polish version of Got Talent, together with Marcin Prokop. He was an independent presidential candidate in 2020 elections, coming in third place in the first round of the elections.

Journalist 
From 1997 to 2000, he worked as an editor of Gazeta Wyborcza, and from 2001 to 2004 as a columnist and editor of Newsweek Polska. From April to July 2005 he was the deputy editor-in-chief of Ozon magazine. From September 2005 to 2006, he worked for Rzeczpospolita daily as an editor of the Plus Minus appendix. He published - among others - in Kultura Popularna, Machina, Przewodnik Katolicki, Tygodnik Powszechny and Więź. In the years 2006–2012 he was again a columnist for Newsweek Polska. From September 2012 to April 2013 he was a columnist for the Wprost weekly. From 2015 he is a regular columnist for Tygodnik Powszechny.

He hosted programs in Radio Białystok, Radio Vox FM, cooperated with Radio PiN.

He has authored twenty books on social issues and religion.

TV 

Together with Marcin Prokop he co-hosted the Polish edition of Got Talent on TVN (2008–2019). In 2006 he was the host of the program "Po prostu pytam" (pl. "I just ask") on TVP1. In the years 2007–2012 he was the program director of Religia.tv. In this station he hosted an ethical talk show "Między sklepami" (pl. "Between Stores") broadcast from the Złote Tarasy shopping mall in Warsaw, the program "Bóg w wielkim mieście" (pl. "God in the Big City") and numerous other programmes.

He was a host of press review in morning show Dzień Dobry TVN.

Humanitarian work 

He founded the Białystok branch of the "Pomoc Maltańska" foundation. In April 2013 he founded the "Kasisi" foundation, and in the following year he established the "Dobra Fabryka" foundation.

As part of the "Dobra Fabryka", aid organized by Hołownia reached, among others, residents of Bangladesh, Mauritania, Rwanda, Burkina Faso and Senegal. In total, the foundation helps around 40,000 people on a yearly basis. The "Kasisi" foundation focuses on running the largest orphanage in Zambia, where more than two hundred children live permanently.

He acts for the children's rights. At the end of 2019 he organized a fundraiser on Facebook, which gathered PLN 2 million (including over PLN 1.5 million paid by Kulczyk Foundation) for further functioning of the telephone helpline for children and youth, run by the "Dajemy Dzieciom Siłę" foundation. The support let the line to operate for another year (24 hours a day), though its rejection by the Ministry of National Education. He is a co-initiator of the Pomocni.info website, addressed to people in a difficult life situation.

He was an ambassador of the UN Sustainable Development Goals.

Political activity 
On 8 December 2019, in the Gdańsk Shakespeare Theatre he has officially issued his candidature for the president election 2020. On 7 February 2020, he issued a manifesto focused on four aspects: national security, environmental protection, solidarity and activity of the local governments. The chief of his electoral staff is Jacek Cichocki. He was supported, among others, by Janina Ochojska. He's basing his campaign almost entirely on volunteers operating at the local offices in 16 major Polish cities and on assets from a public fundraiser. He drummed up 10-20% of support for his candidature.

In 2020 Polish presidential election he received 2,693,397 votes, which was 13.9% of total votes, coming third out of eleven candidates. After the election, he announced the formation of a new political movement called Poland 2050 Movement (Polish: Ruch Polska 2050).

Political views 
Hołownia has expressed support for the core political principles of Poland, such as parliamentary democracy, sovereignty, rule of law, civil society, separation of powers and political pluralism. He emphasizes the importance of the country's political transformation after 1989, though considers some of its effects to be negative. He emphasizes the role of local governments. He regards the Constitution of Poland as the supreme and indisputable legal act on which the president's conduct is based. He is critical towards the First Cabinet of Mateusz Morawiecki and Second Cabinet of Mateusz Morawiecki. He disapproves of the long-term impacts of the Constitutional Court crisis and considers changes in the judiciary carried out by Law and Justice to be unconstitutional. He does not want to be associated with any of political currents (left, right or other), assuming that agreements and common goals can be found with representatives of all views. He positively assesses Poland's membership in NATO, European Union and Weimar Triangle. He supports Poland's good relations with Ukraine.

He proposes a referendum on increasing the health premium in order to repair health care in Poland. According to Hołownia, Poland should allocate 7% of GDP for this purpose. He points out the need to make the doctors' work lighter and to expand telemedicine services. He suggests handing over hospitals with their revenues to the Voivodeship (sub-national) governments in order to improve the quality and availability of services, as elected councillors would be responsible for them. In his opinion, a National Climate Council should be set up to develop a plan for Poland to achieve climate neutrality by 2050 under the European Green Deal, including a move away from coal energy. He considers the water crisis as one of the main ecological problems of Poland. He is a supporter of renewable energy.

Private life 
His wife, Urszula Brzezińska-Hołownia, is a MiG-29 jet fighter pilot and a first lieutenant in the Polish Air Force. They have two daughters (as for 2022). He graduated from the Social High School in Bialystok. He studied psychology at the Warsaw School of Social Psychology but failed to complete his degree.

He is a Roman Catholic. Before getting married, Hołownia had been in the Dominican Order twice and was about to take the monastic ordination.

He is a vegetarian.

Awards 
He won the Grand Press award twice: 2006 in the Interview category for his conversation with the theologian, rev. Jerzy Szymik, titled „Heaven for pigeons” and in 2007 in the Specialist Journalism category for the interview with the ethicist and philosopher dr. Kazimierz Szałata.

In 2004 he was awarded the Business Center Club Press Prize. In 2007, he was awarded the Ślad Award. In 2011, he received the Wiktor award in the Wiktor Audience category for 2010, he was previously nominated for the Wiktor award in 2008 in the category The Greatest Television Discovery. In 2008 he was awarded the MediaTory award by students of journalism from all over Poland in the NawigaTOR category. In 2016, he was awarded the Honorary Medal by the Ombudsman for Children for Merit for the Protection of Children's Rights.

References

1976 births
Living people
Polish journalists
SWPS University alumni
People from Białystok
Candidates in the 2020 Polish presidential election
Former members of Catholic religious institutes
Polish Roman Catholics
Artists from Białystok